North Berwick Lifeboat Station is a Royal National Lifeboat Institution (RNLI) marine-rescue facility in North Berwick, East Lothian, Scotland.

The RNLI first allotted a lifeboat to North Berwick in 1869, in response to the nearby shipwreck of the schooner Bubona the year before. The station closed in 1925 but was re-established in 1967, when the viewers of the BBC children's television programme Blue Peter funded the purchase of four D class lifeboats—one of which, the Blue Peter III, was assigned to North Berwick. Between the years of 1967 and 2013 five Blue Peter Lifeboats, all named Blue Peter III, were placed on station and collectively rescued over 277 people.

The current lifeboat on station is a D-class (D758), the Evelyn M, named after Evelyn Murdoch whose charitable trust (the Evelyn M Murdoch Charitable Trust) paid for the construction of the vessel. The lifeboat was handed over to the RNLI at a ceremony in September 2013 and was accepted on behalf of the RNLI and passed into the care of volunteer crew at North Berwick Lifeboat Station by Sir Peter Housden, Permanent Secretary of the Scottish Government and an RNLI council member. The service of dedication was led by Reverend Neil Dougall, and the boat was named Evelyn M by Helen Hanson, trustee of the Miss Evelyn M Murdoch Charitable Trust.

In the last 100 years the station's rescue crews have received three RNLI awards for gallantry and three Blue Peter gold badges.

Fleet

All Weather Lifeboats (ALBs)

Between 1920 and the closing of the station in 1925 the lifeboats were launched only once with no lives being claimed as saved.

The station was re-opened in 1967 and established as an Inshore Lifeboat Station. Operating out of the lower Granary store, now owned by East Lothian Yacht Club, the original boat house was restored in 1991 and is still used today.

Inshore Lifeboats (ILBs)

References

External links
www.northberwicklifeboat.org.uk
North Berwick Lifeboat Station

Photos
North Berwick Lifeboat flickr group
Lifeboat on parade in North Berwick
Blue Peter III
Emergency lifeboat launch

Blue Peter
Lifeboat stations in Scotland
North Berwick